The Nikon AF-S Zoom-Nikkor 24-120mm 4G IF-ED VR is a 5x Standard zoom lens with a fixed maximum aperture of f/4 throughout its entire zoom range.

Features 
 24-120mm focal length
 Compact silent wave autofocus motor with full-time manual override
 Nikon F-lens mount for use with Nikon FX format DSLRs
 Rear-focussing elements allow for a non-rotating lens front, enabling easier usage of rotating filters such as circular polarisers
 Dust gasket around lens mount to reduce dust entering when lens and camera are attached

Construction 

 17 lens elements in 13 groups
 3 hybrid aspherical elements
 2 ED elements
 Nano crystal coat

See also
List of Nikon compatible lenses with integrated autofocus-motor

References

External links

Nikon F-mount lenses
Camera lenses introduced in 2010